The Nanaimo Group is a geologic group in both British Columbia and Washington state. It preserves fossils dating back to the Cretaceous period.

Divisions 

 Gabriola Formation
Spray Formation
Geoffroy Formation
Northumberland Formation
DeCourcy Formation
Cedar District Formation
Protection Formation
 Haslam Formation
Comox Formation

See also

 List of fossiliferous stratigraphic units in British Columbia

References
 

Cretaceous British Columbia